San Facundo (Safabondu) is one of 44 parishes (administrative divisions) in Tineo, a municipality within the province and autonomous community of Asturias, in northern Spain.

The postal code is 33875.

Villages and hamlets
 Bárzana de San Facundo (Bárzana)
 Barzanicas
 Cerviago (Cerviáu)
 La Cueta
 Mirallo de Arriba (Mirayu d'Arriba)
 Pendosén (Pundusén)
 San Facundo (Safabondu)
 Villacín

References

Parishes in Tineo